The 1884 United States House of Representatives elections in South Carolina were held on November 4, 1884, to select seven Representatives for two-year terms from the state of South Carolina.  Five incumbents were re-elected and the two open seats were split between the Democrats and the Republicans.  The composition of the state delegation after the election was six Democrats and one Republican.

1st congressional district
Incumbent Democratic Congressman Samuel Dibble of the 1st congressional district, in office since 1883, defeated Republican challenger W.N. Taft.

General election results

|-
| 
| colspan=5 |Democratic hold
|-

2nd congressional district
Incumbent Democratic Congressman George D. Tillman of the 2nd congressional district, in office since 1883, defeated Republican challenger E.J. Dickerson.

General election results

|-
| 
| colspan=5 |Democratic hold
|-

3rd congressional district
Incumbent Democratic Congressman D. Wyatt Aiken of the 3rd congressional district, in office since 1877, defeated Republican challenger John R. Tolbert.

General election results

|-
| 
| colspan=5 |Democratic hold
|-

4th congressional district special election
Incumbent Democratic Congressman John H. Evins of the 4th congressional district, in office since 1877, died on October 20, 1884.  A special election was called for December and Democrat John Bratton was unopposed in his bid to serve the rest of the term for the 48th Congress.

General election results

|-
| 
| colspan=5 |Democratic hold
|-

4th congressional district
Incumbent Democratic Congressman John H. Evins of the 4th congressional district, in office since 1877, died on October 20, 1884.  William H. Perry was nominated by the Democrats and was unopposed in his bid for election to the 49th Congress.

General election results

|-
| 
| colspan=5 |Democratic hold
|-

5th congressional district
Incumbent Democratic Congressman John J. Hemphill of the 5th congressional district, in office since 1883, defeated Republican challenger C.C. Macoy.

General election results

|-
| 
| colspan=5 |Democratic hold
|-

6th congressional district
Incumbent Democratic Congressman George W. Dargan of the 6th congressional district, in office since 1883, defeated Republican challenger Edmund H. Deas.

General election results

|-
| 
| colspan=5 |Democratic hold
|-

7th congressional district special election
Incumbent Republican Congressman Edmund William McGregor Mackey of the 7th congressional district, in office since 1883, died on January 27, 1884.  A special election was called for March 18 and Republican Robert Smalls was unopposed in his bid for election.

General election results

|-
| 
| colspan=5 |Republican hold
|-

7th congressional district
Incumbent Republican Congressman Robert Smalls of the 7th congressional district, in office since 1884, defeated Democratic challenger William Elliott.

General election results

|-
| 
| colspan=5 |Republican hold
|-

See also
United States House of Representatives elections, 1884
South Carolina gubernatorial election, 1884
South Carolina's congressional districts

References
"Report of the Secretary of State to the General Assembly of South Carolina." Reports and Resolutions of the General Assembly of the State of South Carolina. Volume II. Columbia, SC: Charles A. Calvo, Jr., 1884, pp. 781, 827–833.

South Carolina
1884
South Carolina